Pistolul model 1998, also known as Dracula, is a machine pistol designed and manufactured by Uzina Mecanică Sadu of Romania. It was designed in 1998 and since 2003 this weapon has been used by Brigada Antitero București (Bucharest Anti-terrorist Brigade) of the Romanian Intelligence Service.

Design
The pistol is similar in construction and operation to the Stechkin APS automatic pistol. However instead of a shoulder stock, Pistolul Md. 1998 has a rail under the muzzle which allows a spare magazine to be attached as a forward grip.

The barrel is rifled, with four polygonal grooves. The pistol can be fitted with a sound suppressor and the manufacturer supplies subsonic 9mm Parabellum cartridges for use with the suppressor.

Pistolul Model 1998 is equipped with a mechanical rear sight, with an adjustable drum for distances of 25, 50, 100 and 200 meters. Optionally, the pistol can be fitted with a target marker (laser micro collimator) or a high powered lamp (intense light spot collimator).

References

External links
Technical specifications from the manufacturer's website

9mm Parabellum machine pistols
Weapons and ammunition introduced in 2003
Firearms of Romania
Machine pistols